David Gutiérrez Palacios (born 28 July 1987 in Madrid) is a Spanish racing cyclist. He is the brother of Iván Gutiérrez.

Palmarès
2008
 U23 National Road Race Champion
2009
6th Vuelta Ciclista a León
2011
3rd Adziondo Klasica

References

1987 births
Living people
Spanish male cyclists
Cyclists from Madrid